Associação Desportiva de Machico is a Volleyball team based in Machico, Madeira, Portugal. It plays in Portuguese Volleyball League A1. It is part of its parent club A.D. Machico, which also runs a semi-professional football team.

Achievements
 Portuguese Volleyball League A2: 1 (2005/06)

Portuguese volleyball teams
Sport in Madeira
Machico